

Erich Buschenhagen (December 8, 1895 – September 13, 1994) was a German general in the Wehrmacht of Nazi Germany who commanded the LII Corps during World War II. He was a recipient of the  Knight's Cross of the Iron Cross with Oak Leaves. Buschenhagen surrendered to the Soviet forces in August 1944, after the Jassy–Kishinev Offensive (August 1944) and was held in the Soviet Union as a war criminal until October 1955.

Awards and decorations
 Iron Cross – 2nd Class (November 22, 1914) & 1st Class  (October 7, 1917)
 Clasp to the Iron Cross – 2nd Class (September 17, 1939) & 1st Class (September 26, 1939)
 German Cross in Gold on July 19, 1942 as Generalmajor in AOK Norwegen
 Knight's Cross of the Iron Cross with Oak Leaves
 Knight's Cross on December 5, 1943 as Generalleutnant and commander of 15. Infanterie Division
 Oak Leaves on July 4, 1944 as General der Infanterie and commander of LII. Armeekorps

References

Citations

Bibliography

 
 
 

1895 births
1994 deaths
Military personnel from Strasbourg
People from Alsace-Lorraine
German Army generals of World War II
Generals of Infantry (Wehrmacht)
German Army personnel of World War I
Recipients of the clasp to the Iron Cross, 1st class
Recipients of the Gold German Cross
Recipients of the Knight's Cross of the Iron Cross with Oak Leaves
Recipients of the Order of the Cross of Liberty, 1st Class
German prisoners of war in World War II held by the Soviet Union
Reichswehr personnel